Western Kentucky is the western portion of the U.S. state of Kentucky. It generally includes part or all of several more widely recognized regions of the state.

Always included
 The Jackson Purchase, the state's westernmost generally recognized region, west of the Tennessee River
 The Western Coal Field, including the Clifty Region

Included in part
 The Pennyroyal Plateau, known in Western Kentucky as the "Pennyrile", which lies south and east of the Western Coal Field and is across the Tennessee River from the Purchase. Most of this region is generally included in "Western Kentucky".

May also be included
 The western half of the region more commonly known as South Central Kentucky, which significantly overlaps with the Pennyrile

See also 
 2021 Western Kentucky tornado

References

Regions of Kentucky